The NER Class N (LNER Class N9) was a class of 0-6-2 tank locomotives of the North Eastern Railway.  It was designed by Wilson Worsdell and introduced in 1893.

Modifications
Most of the engines were modified by fitting larger water tanks. This increased the total capacity from 1371 gallons to 1630 gallons. Three engines still had their original tanks at the 1923 Grouping.

Air brakes were fitted to 10 locomotives between 1900 and 1923. The same engines received vacuum brakes as well, between 1928 and 1931.

Use
The N9s were used on local goods trains.

Numbering

Seventeen locomotives passed into British Railways ownership in 1948 and their BR numbers are shown in the table below.

Withdrawal
Withdrawals took place between 1946 and 1955. None were preserved.

References

0-6-2T locomotives
N
Railway locomotives introduced in 1893
Scrapped locomotives
Standard gauge steam locomotives of Great Britain
Freight locomotives